Gospel magic is the use of otherwise standard stage magic tricks and illusions as object lessons to promote Christian messages. Gospel magic does not claim to invoke spirits or paranormal powers. Gospel magic is intended to present the Christian good news through "visual parables"; the trick or illusion is used to present theological points in an entertaining way with the intention that people will remember the message.  Gospel magic is generally presented as stage magic or platform magic, but it can be adapted to close-up magic or micromagic situations.

History 
The first modern use of Gospel magic is in the ministry of the Italian Catholic priest Giovanni Melchiorre Bosco (Don Bosco, 1815–1888). His autobiography lists many dozens of magic tricks used for the purpose of offering religious instruction to children and youth.
Don Bosco has been seen as the Patron Saint of Catholic Magicians and, specifically, Catholic Gospel Magicians.

In 1910, C. H. Woolston published Seeing Truth: Object Lessons with Magical and Mechanical Effects which aimed to help adults working with children in church. Other texts were soon written that incorporated Gospel messages with magic.

In 1953, the International Fellowship of Christian Magicians began in the US. This rapidly spread the use of the creative arts to teach the Gospel. Many Gospel Performers, dealers and authors made their first attempts at magic under their tuition. There are now chapters in many US and Canadian cities as well as in the UK, Germany and Hong Kong. An international magazine, The Voice of the FCM, is published every two months. Annual conventions are held in US, UK and Germany.

In the Bible 
Biblical references to "magic" are, without exception, the manipulation of supposed preternatural powers usually associated with conjuring spirits in order to foretell the future (1 Samuel 28:7), or dealing with astrology (Isaiah 47:13), rather than stage magic.

The arts and ministry 

The arts have long been used to present Christian teachings. Icons, parables, music, song, dance, poetry, sculpture, painting, stained glass, theater, radio, film, television, the Internet, stage magic and illusion have all been used. Today this often includes story-telling, drama, puppetry, ventriloquism, balloon-modelling and juggling.

American Gospel magicians

Well-known and influential gospel magicians include Duane Laflin, Dennis Regling, David and Teesha Laflin, Andre Kole, Scott Wolf, Dock Haley and Brad Brown.

See also
 Silvio Mantelli
 Illusionist
 List of magic tricks

References

Bibliography 
 Miller, Jule L. Spiritual Applications for Tarbell I. Gospel Services. 1976.
 Miller, Jule L. Spiritual Applications for Tarbell II. Gospel Services. 1984.
These books are based on the Tarbell Course, a standard for stage magicians pre-World War II. It was originally intended to be expanded to cover all eight-volumes in the Tarbell Series, but Miller died before this project was completed. This work is slowly being completed by other magicians unofficially.
 Laflin, Duane. Grand Magic Magazine is published monthly electronically and includes Advance (an earlier magazine) with reflections on key Gospel magic topics and two routines. This magazine also has videos of the routines posted on-line to assist learning.
 Thompson, AD Gospel Magic How to use magic Tricks as Visual Aids, Grove Books Limited Cambridge UK 2001
 Oswald, G and Anderson, K. Gospel Patter for Fifty Familiar Effects, 2007
 Dennis Regling's 52 Weeks of Gospel Magic incorporates magical illusions, chemical reactions, balloon twisting and other performance skills to present Christian lessons.
 Stagnaro, Angelo. The Catechist's Magic Kit. Crossroad Publishing. 2009.

External links 
 Fellowship of Christian Magicians International
 Christian Magicians UK
 Fellowship of Christian Magicians of Germany
 Gospel E-magic
 The Magic Cafe Forums - 100 Years of Seeing Truth

Christian education
Magic (illusion)